"Ilomilo" is a song by American singer-songwriter Billie Eilish and the seventh, final single from her debut studio album, When We All Fall Asleep, Where Do We Go? (2019). The song was released to Italian contemporary hit radio stations on April 10, 2020, by Universal Music Group, and to US alternative radio on May 26, 2020, through Darkroom and Interscope Records. Musically an electropop, electronic, and industrial track with ska-influenced instrumentation, the song was heavily inspired by the puzzle video game of the same name. The track also references "Bury a Friend", its predecessor on the album track list. Eilish wrote the song with its producer, Finneas O'Connell.

The song address several topics including the fear of separation, while her distorted and stuttering voice is sung over a similarly deformed bass. For promotional purposes, the song was performed live during Eilish's 2019 When We All Fall Asleep Tour and her Where Do We Go? World Tour in 2020. On April 24, 2020, an animated visualizer was released for the song. Upon the release of When We All Fall Asleep, Where Do We Go?, the song reached number 62 on the US Billboard Hot 100 and charted within the top 40 in Canada and Australia. It was certified gold in each of these countries.

Background
"Ilomilo" was written by Eilish and her brother, Finneas O'Connell, who also produced it. Mastering and mixing was handled by studio personnel, John Greenham and Rob Kinelski, respectively. Casey Cuayo is credited as studio personnel and as an additional mixer. In an Instagram story on March 25, 2020, Eilish shared a playlist of her inspirations for the track, which included songs from XXXTentacion, Kavinsky, Daniel Olsen and Aaron Zigman. When Eilish mentions the song to her mom Maggie Baird, she describes the track as "being a parent to her".

Composition and lyrical interpretation
According to sheet music website Musicnotes.com, "Ilomilo" is moderately fast at 120 beats per minute (BPM) and is played in the key of C minor. Eilish's vocals range between G3 to A4. Critical commentary described "Ilomilo" as a mid-tempo electropop and electronic industrial track. The New York Times Jon Pareles noted the use of a "briskly plinking, near-ska beat" in its instrumentation.  Throughout the song, her voice is distorted to sound like she is stuttering, and her vocal track is layered over a similarly deformed-sounding bass and "paranoid" synths. Sean Ward, for The Line of Best Fit, wrote that the song sees "the demon is in a place of contemplation".

In April 2020, during a 50-minute Verizon livestream, Eilish explains "Ilomilo" is about "losing somebody, or being afraid of losing somebody and it kind of being inevitable. It feels horrible and terrifying. Especially when you lose a person, it's a horrible feeling, so it's the feeling of being afraid." The singer revealed the puzzle video game of the same name, whose goal is to reunite two characters named "Ilo" and "Milo" who hug afterwards, was a major inspiration for the song. Music critics have associated its lyrics with the fear of separation (in lines such as "I don't wanna be lonely" and "I can't lose another life"), to a failed relationship ("I just wanted to protect you / But now I'll never get to") and suicidal thoughts ("I might break / If you're gonna die not by mistake"). Chris DeVille, writing for Stereogum, noted that the song finds Eilish "in a world wrecked by tragedy". The lyrics in the second verse of "Ilomilo"—"The friends I've had to bury / They keep me up at night"—reference the single "Bury a Friend" (2019), the song's predecessor on When We All Fall Asleep, Where Do We Go?, which ends with the opening instrumental section of "Ilomilo". Elaborating on this in an interview on MTV, O'Connell said the two songs only referenced each other for the purpose of making the album "cohesive", and that they were not linked in any other way.

Critical reception
"Ilomilo" was met with positive reviews from music critics. Insider Libby Torres, called the track "catchy" and felt its lyrics "[do] [their] best to parse the emptiness left by someone important", as "insanely relatable". Jason Lipshutz of Billboard also commended the lyrics, which he described as "propulsive". Sam Prance of PopBuzz stated the song's production was "clever". Madeline Roth of MTV called the song a "thumping beat", while Deville described it as "skittering". Sean Ward writing for The Line of Best Fit, interpreted the song as being "disturbing". Yasmin Cowan of Clash depicted the song as an "anxious lullaby". The staff of NME, who called the song "fitting", commented that as you listen to the track, your "interest in 'Ilomilo' will only grow the more you listen to it."

Release and commercial performance
On March 29, 2019, "Ilomilo" was released as the eleventh track on Billie Eilish's debut studio album When We All Fall Asleep, Where Do We Go?. The song was sent to Italian contemporary hit radio stations on April 10, 2020, by Universal Music Group, and later to US alternative radio on May 26 through Darkroom and Interscope Records, as the album's seventh and final single. On February 22, 2020, Eilish released a live version of "Ilomilo" that was performed at the Houston's Toyota Center on October 10, 2019.

Following the release of When We All Fall Asleep, Where Do We Go?, "Ilomilo" debuted at number 62 on the US Billboard Hot 100. At the same time, Eilish broke the record for the most simultaneous Hot 100 entries for a female artist. After its release to US alternative radio, "Ilomilo" peaked at number 25 on the Alternative Airplay chart and number 30 on the Hot Rock & Alternative Songs chart. It has been certified gold by the Recording Industry Association of America (RIAA), which denotes track-equivalent sales of 500,000 units based on sales and streams. "Ilomilo" charted within the top 20 in Lithuania and Latvia. The song has further peaked within the top 40 in Australia and Canada. It earned a gold certification by Music Canada (MC) and Federazione Industria Musicale Italiana (FIMI), and a platinum certification by the Australian Recording Industry Association (ARIA). "Ilomilo" reached modest peaks in Germany, Sweden and the Netherlands among others. The song achieved moderate success in the United Kingdom, peaking at number 37 on the UK Streaming chart.

Live performances and other usages

To promote "Ilomilo", Eilish performed it at the Coachella Valley Music and Arts Festival in April, at the Glastonbury Festival in June, and at Pukkelpop in August 2019. "Ilomilo" was included on the setlist of Eilish's 2019 When We All Fall Asleep Tour. In December 2019, Eilish performed "Ilomilo" at the Steve Jobs Theater for the first annual Apple Music Awards after she won artist of the year, with O'Connell playing the piano. The track was also included on the setlist of her 2020 Where Do We Go? World Tour. In April of the same year, Eilish and O'Connell performed the song during the 50-minute Verizon livestream. "Ilomilo" was included on Eilish's Happier Than Ever, The World Tour (2022).

In March 2020, American a cappella group Pentatonix recorded a cover of "Ilomilo" exclusively for WhatsApp using 8D technology. An animated visualizer to accompany the song, depicting deep sea creatures, was released to Eilish's YouTube channel on April 24, 2020.

A more rhythmic cover that banged Russian dance airplay stations back in 2021 was released in early 2022 on the Spinnin' Records.

Credits and personnel 
Credits adapted from Tidal.

 Casey Cuayo – assistant mixer, studio personnel
 Billie Eilish – vocals, songwriter
 John Greenham – mastering engineer, studio personnel
 Rob Kinelski – mixer, studio personnel
 Finneas O'Connell – producer, songwriter

Charts

Weekly charts

Year-end charts

Certifications

Release history

Notes

References

Billie Eilish songs
2019 songs
2020 singles
Song recordings produced by Finneas O'Connell
Songs written by Billie Eilish
Songs written by Finneas O'Connell
Electropop songs
Songs about loneliness
Music based on video games